Octavio Gregorio "Maguila" Magoliço (born 4 October 1984) is a Mozambican basketball player who currently plays for Ferroviário de Maputo of the Mozambican League.

International career 
Magoliço is also a member of the Mozambique national basketball team and appeared with the club at the 2005, 2007 and 2009 African Championships. He was Mozambique's leading scorer in both the 2007 and 2009 tournaments, averaging 17.8 and 13.4 points per game, respectively.

Honours
Mozambican League (2): 2018, 2019

References

1984 births
Living people
Mozambican men's basketball players
Centers (basketball)
African Games silver medalists for Mozambique
African Games medalists in basketball
Competitors at the 2011 All-Africa Games
Ferroviário de Maputo (basketball) players